Johannes Boesiger (born 9 October 1962, in Freiburg im Breisgau) is a Swiss/German scriptwriter and producer. He is known for his work on Children of the Open Road (1992), Fly Little Bird and Tatort (1970).

Life and work 

Johannes Boesiger was born the son of the Swiss actor and director Paul Bösiger. He was born in Freiburg i. Br. in Germany and at the age of 14 Boesiger became a professional actor for the city theatre of Nuremberg, where took on the main character in the play Be silent, boy! by Fitzgerald Kusz. The same year Boesiger worked as 2nd assistant director for his father. Following the early death of his father, Boesiger moved to Switzerland. At the age of twenty he started to work as a film critic for various newspapers in Germany, Austria and Switzerland including Der Tagesspiegel, Die Presse and Die Weltwoche and in 1984 became film editor at the renowned Neue Zürcher Zeitung. In 1989 Boesiger changed sides again, when he was hired by Swiss television to become in house producer, script developer and writer.

Having contributed to various television and theatrical productions as producer, writer or script editor, in 1992 he wrote and produced his award winning first feature film, Kinder der Landstrasse. This was followed by further works as executive and line producer before he started in 2001 on a project to develop a cultural centre in the city of Zürich. Boesiger is currently active again as producer and writer of various English language projects. In 2018 he was appointed as managing director for the production company Jovera Pictures AG/SA/Ltd' overseeing among others the production of Fly Little Bird' based on his own script and to be directed by him.

Besides his main career as a producer, Johannes Boesiger was active between 1989 and 1995 on the management board of the Locarno International Film Festival, co-founder of the Carl Mayer Scriptwriting award in Graz, Austria, and lately in 2007 together with Dieter Kosslick, was one of the initiators of the section "culinary cinema" at the Berlin International Film Festival today directed by Thomas Struck.

Theatre and radio plays 
 1976 — Be silent, boy!  Schweig, Bub!, Städtische Bühnen Nürnberg
 1977 — Be silent, boy!, Bayrischer Rundfunk
 1987 — Korbes, Süddeutscher Rundfunk

Filmography

Awards 
 1992 — Best foreign picture for "Children of the open road". (Fort Lauderdale Filmfestival)
 1992 — Grand prix du jury for "Children of the open road". (Festival du film d'Amiens)

References

External links 
 
 Children of the Open Road on IMDb
 Children of the Open Road at San Francisco Festival
 Zabuti on IMDb' (The Forgotten, Co-producer, Spielfilm Ukraine/Schweiz
 Fly Little Bird on IMDb

1962 births
Film people from Freiburg im Breisgau
Living people